Gareth Ryder-Hanrahan is an Irish game designer and novelist who has worked primarily on role-playing games.

Career
Hanrahan was one of the game designers included in the experimental community connected to the Gaming Outpost. When Mongoose Publishing brought their Paranoia writing in-house, it was overseen by Hanrahan. Hanrahan wrote Mongoose's fifth RuneQuest setting, Hawkmoon: The Roleplaying Game (2007). Hanrahan authored the Traveller Core Rulebook (2008), which managed to outsell RuneQuest and become Mongoose's new #1 game. Hanrahan's 12th-century setting Deus Vult (2010) received new support in RuneQuest II. When Mongoose separated from Rebellion in March 2010, Hanrahan was one of those let go during the resulting layoffs.

Hanrahan helped Pelgrane Press support their GUMSHOE System by producing monthly supplements, starting in late 2010. In 2011, Cubicle 7 expanded its staff with industry insiders like Hanrahan, Walt Ciechanowski, Charles Ryan, and Neil Ford. He is currently employed as a full-time writer for Pelgrane Press. He also holds the position of Line Developer for The Laundry Files roleplaying game published by Cubicle 7.

Fiction
Hanrahan is the author of the Paranoia novel Reality Optional. He has also contributed short stories to the Stone Skin Press anthologies The Lion and the Aardvark and Schemers.

He released his debut novel in 2019, and its sequels in the "Black Iron Legacy" series in 2020 and 2021:
The Gutter Prayer, Orbit, January 22, 2019
The Shadow Saint, Orbit, January 7, 2020
The Broken God, Orbit, May 18, 2021

The series is a gothic/steampunk adventure, set in the city of Guerdon, which has been described as being inspired by Hanrahan's native city of Cork.

Awards and nominations

Hanrahan has received the following ENnie awards:

2011: Best New Game (Silver), The Laundry RPG by Cubicle 7
2012: Best Rules (Silver), Lorefinder: GUMSHOE Pathfinder Mashup by Pelgrane Press

Hanrahan has received the following ENnie nominations:

2012: Best Adventure, Dead Rock Seven by Pelgrane Press
2012: Best Adventure, Invasive Procedures by Pelgrane Press
2013: Best Adventure, The Zalozhniy Quartet by Pelgrane Press

Hanrahan has received the following Origins nominations:

2014: Best RPG Supplement, The Heart of the Wild by Cubicle 7

Games

Games designed / written by Hanrahan include:

The Slayer's Guide to Titans (2003)
The Quintessential Halfling (2003)
The Quintessential Paladin II: Advanced Tactics (2004)
The Quintessential Druid II (2004)
OGL Horror (2004)
The Traitor's Manual (2004), Paranoia RPG
EarthForce Campaign Book (2005), Babylon 5 RPG
Conan: The Roleplaying Game (2007, 2nd edition)
Eyes of the Stone Thief (2015), 13th Age RPG

References

External links
 Gareth Hanrahan :: Pen & Paper RPG Database archive
 Irish Gaming Wiki entry

Irish fantasy writers
Irish male novelists
Living people
Role-playing game designers
Year of birth missing (living people)